is a former Japanese football player and manager.

Playing career
Yabe was born in Aichi Prefecture on May 26, 1978. After graduating from high school, he joined his local club Nagoya Grampus Eight in 1997. However he could not play at all in the match. In June 2000, he moved to J2 League club Sagan Tosu with Hiroki Mihara. He became a regular player and played many matches for a long time. In 2005, he moved to Japan Football League club FC Horikoshi (later Arte Takasaki). Although he played as regular player in 2005, his opportunity to play decreased for injury in 2006 and he was sacked in July. After a year and a half blank, he joined Nara Club in 2008. He retired end of 2011 season.

Coaching career
After retirement, Yabe became a general manager for Nara Club in 2012. In July 2012, he became a manager and managed the club until October 2013.

Club statistics

References

External links

1978 births
Living people
Association football people from Aichi Prefecture
Japanese footballers
J1 League players
J2 League players
Japan Football League players
Nagoya Grampus players
Sagan Tosu players
Arte Takasaki players
Nara Club players
Association football midfielders